Peter Lim (born 21 May 1953) is a Singaporean business magnate who was a stockbroker, and is now a private investor who has invested in sectors ranging from palm oil to medicine. In 2019, Forbes ranked him as the 10th richest person in Singapore with a net worth of US$2.5 billion. He is a shareholder of English club Salford City and the owner of Spanish La Liga club Valencia CF since 2014.

In 2010, Lim won the biggest libel payout in Singapore's history in the Raffles Town Club saga.

Early life
The son of a fishmonger, Lim and his seven siblings grew up in a two-bedroom government flat in the Bukit Ho Swee public housing estate. Lim completed his secondary school education at the Raffles Institution. After National Service, he went to Perth to study at the University of Western Australia. To fund his university education, Lim worked part-time doing odd jobs as a taxi driver, cook and waiter.

It was while working at Australian fast-food chain Red Rooster that he learnt how business was done. Lim studied how they started, how they grew, and how they scaled up.

He graduated with a degree in accounting and finance and first worked as an accountant and did some tax consultancy before going into stocks.

Early career
In the early 1990s, Lim invested about US$10 million in a start-up palm-oil company, Wilmar. In 2010, Lim cashed out at the peak of commodity prices and sold his Wilmar shares for US$1.5 billion.

Known as the "Remisier King" due to his success in stocks, Lim explains that while there was an element of luck, it was also because he created a role for himself as a "one man merchant bank" in the M&A space in Indonesia in the late 80s.

Lim quit the brokerage business in 1996 and became a private investor. He was able to escape the 1998 Asian Financial Crisis as he had liquidated most of his stocks and was holding cash.

Sports investment 

In the sports sector, Lim owns a controlling stake (83%) in Spanish La Liga club Valencia CF, a 40% stake in Salford City F.C (with former Manchester United players Ryan Giggs, Gary Neville, Phil Neville, Paul Scholes, Nicky Butt and David Beckham holding the other 60%), stakes in British supercar maker McLaren Automotive and Hotel Football next to Old Trafford stadium in Manchester. Since becoming majority shareholder of Valencia CF in 2014, the club has qualified for the UEFA Champions League only 3 times, but also won the Copa del Rey in 2019. After six years of ownership, the club consistently underperformed and achieved some of the poorest results in its modern history. Separately, Salford City achieved 4 promotions in 5 seasons to reach League Two in 2019. Salford City also won the delayed 2020 Papa John's Trophy after beating Portsmouth 4–2 on penalties.

In May 2014, Lim was designated by the Fundación Valencia CF as the buyer of 70.4% of the shares owned by the club's foundation. After months of negotiations between Lim and Bankia (the main creditor of the club), an agreement was reached in August 2014. Nuno Espírito Santo was hired as head manager on 2 July 2014, which was one of the conditions Lim had insisted on when buying the club. This raised eyebrows in the media because of Nuno's close relationship with the football agent Jorge Mendes, whose first-ever client was Nuno. Lim and Mendes are also close friends and business partners. Regardless, Nuno's first season was a successful one. Notable signings included Álvaro Negredo, André Gomes and Enzo Pérez, who had just won the LPFP Primeira Liga Player of the Year in the Portuguese Primeira Liga. Valencia finished the 2014–15 season in fourth place for Champions League qualification with 77 points, just one point ahead of Sevilla after a dramatic final week, defeating Granada 4–0.

Valencia had a poor start to the 2015–16 season, winning 5 out of 13 matches and failing to progress from the Champions League group stages. The fans were also increasingly concerned about the growing influence of Jorge Mendes in the club's activities. On 29 November, Nuno resigned as manager and former Manchester United defender Gary Neville was hired as his replacement on 2 December. Valencia went winless for nine matches before earning their first win under Neville in a 2–1 victory at home against Espanyol. On 30 March 2016, Neville was sacked after recording the lowest win percentage in La Liga history for a Valencia manager with minimum of five matches, winning just 3 out of 16 matches. He was replaced by Pako Ayestarán, who was brought in by Neville as the assistant coach just one month prior. Valencia finished the season in 12th position, even despite having the 4th biggest budget in the competition.

In the summer of 2016, André Gomes and Paco Alcácer were both sold to Barcelona and Shkodran Mustafi was sold to Arsenal, while Ezequiel Garay and former Manchester United player Nani were brought in. Pako Ayestarán was sacked on 21 September 2016 after four-straight defeats at the beginning of the 2016–17 season. Former Italy national team head coach Cesare Prandelli was hired as his replacement on 28 September. However, he resigned after just three months on 30 December, claiming the club had made him false transfer promises. Days later, on 7 January 2017, Valencia sporting director Jesús García Pitarch also resigned, saying he felt like he was being used as a shield for criticism by the club and that he could not defend something he no longer believed in. Voro was named caretaker manager for the fifth time until the end of season, with Valencia in 17th position and in danger of relegation. However, results improved under Voro and he steered Valencia clear off relegation, ultimately finishing the season in 12th place. On 27 March, Mateu Alemany was named the new director general of Valencia.

The club also announced club president Lay Hoon Chan had submitted her resignation and that she would be replaced by Anil Murthy. After rumours arose of Lim's attempts at selling the club, Murthy assured the fans and local media that Valencia was a long-term project for both him and Lim, and they would not consider selling the club. For the following season, former Villarreal coach Marcelino was named the new manager on 12 May.

After a successful first season under Marcelino, the club secured 4th position and a return to the Champions League. Valencia also reached the semi-finals of the UEFA Europa League. On 25 May 2019, Valencia won the Copa del Rey for the first time since 2008, upsetting FC Barcelona in the final. However, both Marcelino and sporting director Mateu Alemany, were fired on 11 September 2019 after falling out with Lim. The manager was replaced by Albert Celades, who was eventually sacked after a run of poor results despite earlier qualifying for the UEFA Champions League knockout stages, while new sports director César Sanchez resigned that same season, making six different managers and another six sports directors by 2020.

For season 2020–21, manager Javi Gracia was hired. He was put in charge of a team of young prospects and lower profile players after failing to sign any player during summer transfer season, while the club was selling key players such as captain Dani Parejo, who left for free to regional rivals Villarreal. Ferran Torres was sold to Manchester City for half his market value, as he refused to renew his contract and attempted to leave for free. Overall, Valencia sold players worth 85 million dollars in order to rebalance the club's books. These arrangements allowed the club to continue paying salaries to the players, which failed to do at the beginning of the season. During the winter season, the club reinforced the team with three loan signings, Italian striker Patrick Cutrone, Uruguayan midfielder Christian Oliva, and central defender Ferro. After six seasons under Peter Lim's ownership, Valencia CF began to pay the banks, which it was financially unable to do previously. The club thus far has accumulated loses of 323 million euros in the club, while the value of his biggest investment company, Thomson Medical Group, lost 1.7 billion euros during the same six-year period. His management resulting in player sell-offs and lack of inward transfers has been criticised by Valencia's fans, players such as Geoffrey Kondogbia, and managers and directors such as Cesare Prandelli, Javier Subirats, and Javi Gracia.

In October 2021, Peter Lim co-founded ZujuGP with his son. ZujuGP is envisioned as a digital platform to digitize the live game experience for fans by providing entertainment, networking and e-commerce options. It will also build an ecosystem of services for teams to recruit players, club personnel, train and mentor aspiring players powered by its open source, AI-driven platform. ZujuGP is endorsed by Manchester United star Cristiano Ronaldo who is a long time friend and partner of Peter Lim.

During Season 2022-23, the situation of Valencia CF worsened far more. Manager Gennaro Gattuso was sacked in January, leaving the team in relegation spots. His substitute, Rubén Baraja, was the 12th manager the team had since Lim arrived, averaging two different managers per season. In the meanwhile, Valencia fans have been protesting against Lim's dismanagement of the team for years, with a Fan Club addressing a protest letter to the Singapore Consulate in Madrid.

Philanthropy 
In June 2010 the Singapore Olympic Foundation (SOF) set up the SOF-Peter Lim Scholarship with a S$10 million donation from Lim. The gift is the single largest donation in Singapore from an individual towards sports development. The recipients are typically students who come from financially challenged backgrounds and have demonstrated a potential to excel in their respective sports. In 2019, Lim further pledged to continue supporting young local athletes for another 10 years from 2021 to 2030 by donating another S$10 million to the SOF-Peter Lim Scholarship. Since the inception of the scholarship, 2642 student-athletes have received scholarships amounting to $7.2 million.

Lim further committed a separate $20 million to start a new community project focused on helping children from less privileged backgrounds, with the aim of helping them reach their potential.

In 2014, Lim also endowed Nanyang Technological University with S$3 million to fund a professorship in peace studies at the S. Rajaratnam School of International Studies to protect and promote harmony in Singapore.

References

External links
Bio at Forbes
 Write-up at The Wall Street Journal
Singapore Olympic Foundation–Peter Lim Scholarship

1953 births
Place of birth missing (living people)
Living people
Raffles Institution alumni
University of Western Australia alumni
Singaporean billionaires
Singaporean chief executives
Singaporean investors
Singaporean people of Chinese descent
Singaporean soccer chairmen and investors
Singaporean stockbrokers
Singaporean taxi drivers
McLaren people
Salford City F.C. chairmen and investors